Swing Flugsportgeräte GmbH is a German aircraft manufacturer based in Landsberied,  west of Munich, near the Bavarian Alps.

The company specializes in the design and manufacture of paragliders and paramotor wings in the form of ready-to-fly aircraft, as well as paragliding harnesses, reserve parachutes and accessories.

The company is organized as a Gesellschaft mit beschränkter Haftung (GmbH), a German limited liability company.

Founded in 1986, Swing is one of the oldest paraglider manufacturers and has a network of 170 distributors in 48 countries. The company's Arcus beginner level paraglider is one of the best-selling designs in the history of paragliding, with more than 8,500 sold.

Aircraft 

Summary of aircraft built by Swing:
Swing Apus
Swing Arcus
Swing Astral
Swing Axis
Swing Brave
Swing Cirrus
Swing Connect
Swing Core
Swing Discus
Swing Hybrid
Swing Mirage
Swing Mistral
Swing Mito
Swing Naja
Swing Nexus
Swing Nyos
Swing Scorpio
Swing Sensis
Swing Spitfire
Swing Sting
Swing Stratus
Swing Trinity
Swing Tusker
Swing Twin

References

External links

Aircraft manufacturers of Germany
Paramotors
Paragliders
Companies established in 1986
1986 establishments in West Germany
German brands